Sweden originally planned to participate in the Eurovision Song Contest 2020. The Swedish broadcaster Sveriges Television (SVT) organises the national final Melodifestivalen 2020 in order to select the Swedish entry for the 2020 contest in Rotterdam, the Netherlands. However, the contest was cancelled due to the COVID-19 pandemic.

Background 

Sweden had won the contest on six occasions: in 1974 with the song "Waterloo" performed by ABBA, in 1984 with the song "Diggi-Loo Diggi-Ley" performed by Herreys, in 1991 with the song "" performed by Carola, in 1999 with the song "Take Me to Your Heaven" performed by Charlotte Nilsson, in 2012 with the song "Euphoria" performed by Loreen, and in 2015 with the song "Heroes" performed by Måns Zelmerlöw.

The Swedish national broadcaster, Sveriges Television (SVT), broadcasts the event within Sweden and organises the selection process for the nation's entry. Since 1959, SVT has organised the annual competition  in order to select the Swedish entry for the Eurovision Song Contest.

Before Eurovision

Melodifestivalen 2020 

Four heats, a Second Chance round and a final were held. It was held between 1 February and 7 March 2020.

Heats and Second Chance round 

 The first heat took place on 1 February 2020 at the Saab Arena in Linköping. "Move" performed by the Mamas and "Take a Chance" performed by Robin Bengtsson qualified directly to the final, while "Ballerina" performed by Malou Prytz and "Boys with Emotions" performed by Felix Sandman advanced to the Second Chance round. "Moves" performed by Suzi P, "" performed by OVÖ, and "" performed by Sonja Aldén were eliminated from the contest.
 The second heat took place on 9 February 2020 at the Scandinavium arena in Gothenburg. "Kingdom Come" performed by Anna Bergendahl and "Bulletproof" performed by Dotter qualified directly to the final, while "" performed by Méndez feat. Alvaro Estrella and "Talking in My Sleep" performed by Paul Rey advanced to the Second Chance round. "Nobody" performed by Klara Hammarström, "" performed by Jan Johansen, and "" performed by Linda Bengtzing were eliminated from the contest.
 The third heat took place on 15 February 2020 at the Coop Norrbotten Arena in Luleå. "Shout It Out" performed by Mariette and "Winners" performed by Mohombi qualified directly to the final, while "" performed by Anis don Demina and "" performed by Drängarna advanced to the Second Chance round. "" performed by Albin Johnsén, "Late" performed by Amanda Aasa, and "Crying Rivers" performed by Faith Kakembo were eliminated from the contest.
 The fourth heat took place on 22 February 2020 at the Malmö Arena in Malmö. "Brave" performed by Hanna Ferm and "Troubled Waters" performed by Victor Crone qualified directly to the final, while "We Are One" performed by Frida Öhrn and "Surface" performed by Ellen Benediktson and Simon Peyron advanced to the Second Chance round. "" performed by William Stridh, "Carpool Karaoke" performed by Nanne Grönvall, and "" performed by Jakob Karlberg were eliminated from the contest.
"" performed by Anis don Demina, "Talking in My Sleep" performed by Paul Rey, "Boys with Emotions" performed by Felix Sandman, and "" performed by Méndez feat. Alvaro Estrella qualified to the final.

Final 
The final took place on 7 March 2020 at the Friends Arena in Stockholm.

References

External links
Official SVT Eurovision website

2020
Countries in the Eurovision Song Contest 2020
Eurovision
Eurovision